Ideal is an unincorporated community in northern Tripp County, South Dakota, United States. It lies north of the city of Winner, the county seat.  Its elevation is 1,886 feet (575 m). The population of the CDP was 86 at the 2020 census.

Ideal's town site was considered to be "ideal" for farming, hence the name.

Demographics

References

Unincorporated communities in Tripp County, South Dakota
Unincorporated communities in South Dakota